The Rakeahua River is a river in Stewart Island/Rakiura, New Zealand, flowing into Paterson Inlet.

See also
List of rivers of New Zealand

References

Rivers of Stewart Island